Mendis is a common Sinhalese surname derived from the Português surname Mendes which was introduced to Sri Lanka during Portuguese rule in Sri Lanka. It may refer to

Ajantha Mendis, Sri Lankan cricketer
B. J. P. Mendis, Surveyor General in Sri Lanka
Buddhika Mendis, Sri Lankan cricketer
Chaminda Mendis, Sri Lankan cricketer
Cletus Mendis, Sri Lankan actor
Damien Mendis, British Sri Lankan music producer composer
Duleep Mendis, Sri Lankan cricketer
Gehan Mendis, Sri Lankan cricketer
Ishan Mendis, Sri Lankan actor
Jeevan Mendis, Sri Lankan cricketer
Kanchana Mendis, Sri Lankan actress
Kusal Mendis, Sri Lankan cricketer
Nandana Mendis, Sri Lankan politician
Nimal Mendis, Sri Lankan singer
Paddy Mendis, Sri Lankan air force officer
Patrick Mendis, Sri Lanka-born American diplomat and Nato and Pacific Command military professor
Randolph Jewell Francis Mendis, Sri Lankan army officer
Ramesh Mendis, Sri Lankan cricketer
Solias Mendis, Sri Lankan temple artist
Sriyantha Mendis, Sri Lankan actor
Susirith Mendis, Sri Lankan academic
Viraj Mendis, Sri Lankan activist
Vernon Mendis, Sri Lankan diplomat
Yashoda Mendis, Sri Lankan cricketer
Valence Mendis, 4th Bishop of Chilaw
Wijayapala Medis, Sri Lankan Politician

Sinhalese surnames